The Letters is a 2014 American biographical drama film directed and written by William Riead. The film stars Juliet Stevenson, Max von Sydow, Rutger Hauer and Priya Darshini. It was produced by Colin Azzopardi, Tony Cordeaux, and Lisa Riead. It was released theatrically by Freestyle Releasing on December 4, 2015.

Plot
Mother Teresa (Juliet Stevenson), recipient of the Nobel Peace Prize, is considered one of the greatest humanitarians of modern times. Her selfless commitment changed hearts, lives and inspired millions throughout the world. The film is told through personal letters she wrote over the last forty years of her life and reveal a troubled and vulnerable woman who grew to feel an isolation and an abandonment by God. The story is told from the point of view of a Vatican priest (Max von Sydow) charged with the task of investigating acts and events following her death. He recounts her life’s work, her political oppression, her religious zeal, and her unbreakable spirit.

Cast
 Juliet Stevenson as Mother Teresa
 Rutger Hauer as Father Benjamin Praggh
 Max von Sydow as Father Celeste van Exem
 Priya Darshini as Shubashini Das
 Kranti Redkar as Deepa Ambereesh
 Mahabanoo Mody-Kotwal as Mother General
 Tillotama Shome as Kavitha Singh
 Vijay Maurya as Maharaj Singh
 Vivek Gomber as Ashwani Sharma
 Pravishi Das as Dinsha Sahu
 Rustom Mistry as Doctor

Production

Development
Riead began exploring ideas for an inspirational and uplifting film just before the devastating terror attacks of September 11, 2001, forced a realization on him that would come to define his project. “I didn’t know there was that kind of evil in this world until then,” says Riead. “The attacks really brought that home."

The Letters became a labor of love for Riead during the fourteen years it would take to produce the film. The turning point for Riead was the discovery of a startling cache of heartfelt, formerly confidential letters written by Mother Teresa to her spiritual advisor, the Belgian Jesuit priest Celeste van Exem, over a nearly 50-year correspondence. In her letters, some of which have been published in the 2007 book Mother Teresa: Come Be My Light, Teresa revealed a profound spiritual suffering and emptiness experienced by some other saints, often referred to as a dark night of the soul. Riead read all of the letters that were available to the public and decided that they would make up the spine of his screenplay.

Casting
When the time came to cast the film, Riead had a wealth of actresses clamoring to don Mother Teresa’s habit. To play her confessor, Father van Exem, Riead cast Max von Sydow, the Swedish star who has been a favorite of directors ranging from Ingmar Bergman to Martin Scorsese. When von Sydow asked the director for some insight into the character, Riead gave him a simple but telling answer. “I said, the whole world looked up to Mother Teresa,” he recalls. “And Mother Teresa looked up to Father van Exem. He just looked at me for a long moment, and he said, ‘got it.’ And that was it. He showed up and knew exactly what to do.”

To portray the sisters and students of the Loreto Convent, the Bishop of Calcutta, Mother Teresa’s wealthy benefactors, and the residents of the poverty stricken slums, Riead cast professional actors from India’s Bollywood film industry, considered the largest in the world.

Filming
The film was shot primarily in India, with interiors shot in Goa and second unit filming taking place in Calcutta, Delhi, and Mumbai. The scenes featuring Max von Sydow and Rutger Hauer (as van Exem’s confidant, Father Benjamin Praagh), were shot in a 15th-century London monastery.

Release
The Letters premiered at the Sedona Film Festival in February 2014. It was released theatrically on December 4, 2015.

Reception
Variety (magazine) : The Letters, thereby leaving its portrait feeling flimsy and half-formed. Opting for dutiful, reverent beatification over flesh-and-blood characterizations (or insights), the film is merely a clunky primer on how poor storytelling can make even the grandest of figures seem small — a fact that’s true with regard to Teresa as well as von Sydow, in a monotonous, creaky performance best left off his resume.

The Hollywood Reporter : A movie exploring the conflict between Teresa’s outward confidence and private “darkness” could be psychologically fascinating. But simply having Von Sydow tell us over and over that she felt “a terrible emptiness” is no substitute for showing that torment in action. Not a trace of doubt or existential despair comes across in scenes of the nun’s life, and the script doesn’t even dip into those letters (a collection of which was published years ago) to let us hear of it in her own words.

References

External links
 
 
 
 

2014 films
2014 biographical drama films
2014 independent films
American biographical drama films
American independent films
Films about Catholicism
Films about Catholic nuns
Films about Nobel laureates
Films shot in Goa
Films shot in London
Cultural depictions of Mother Teresa
2014 drama films
Films set in India
Films set in Kolkata
Films shot in Delhi
Films shot in Mumbai
Films shot in Kolkata
Films set in the partition of India
Christianity in India
Films about Christianity
2010s English-language films
2010s American films